Bethel is an unincorporated community that lies on Long Branch, a tiny stream that runs into the Shenandoah River in Clarke County, Virginia. It lies at the crossroads of Swift Shoals and Kennel Roads.

Etymology
Bethel takes its name from the Old Bethel Church there.

References

Unincorporated communities in Clarke County, Virginia
Unincorporated communities in Virginia